Trajko Loparski (Macedonian Cyrillic: Трајко Лопарски) was a Mayor of Kumanovo, Kingdom of Yugoslavia before the Second World War started.

Business
He owned "Stara Banja" restaurant in the village of Proevce. His descendants reopened the restaurant and named it after him.

See also
 List of mayors of Kumanovo

References

1989 births
Yugoslav Macedonia
Yugoslav politicians
Living people